Emilio Changco was a pirate gang leader based out of Manila Bay in the Philippines. He specialized in piracy-for-order, where a client hires the Changco Gang to seize then remove its cargo and then sell the ship. Changco was eventually captured and imprisoned by Philippine authorities. In 1992 he was killed by law-enforcement agents under circumstances which have been characterised as suspicious. Philippine government officials claim he was shot while trying to escape from the New Bilibid Prison, although the fact that he was disabled and used a cane raised suspicions about the official claim.

Changco Gang
In the 1980s and 1990s while operating out of Manila Bay, Changco and his men used the area's thousands of islands and many small ports to their advantage. They specialized in targeted piracy where a client would pay $US 300,000 and then tell the gang which ship was to be targeted. The ship would be raided by the gang and then the ship, its crew confined, would be sailed to an out of the way port all the while transmitting to its owners that it was stricken by mechanical difficulties and confined to port. In at least one instance, members of Changco's gang would stowaway on the ship before it set sail and then assist other pirates in boarding once the ship set sail.  After the seizure, either in port or at sea, the cargo would be transferred to another ship and then the crew would be unloaded and told not to report the incident for a few days. This allowed the Changco gang to paint over the ship making it a "phantom-ship" that could be used for other tasks such as smuggling goods or human smuggling.

Changco was well known throughout the region and companies would often hire him to steal back their cargoes.  Companies would also hire him for insurance fraud. The insurance fraud occurred through a company overestimating the value of a ship near the end of its service life, then over-insuring the ship before hiring the Changco gang to seize the ship. The missing ship would be resold by the gang and the original owner would claim the insurance money for the ship.

Arrest, imprisonment and death

By the early 1990s, Changco became so brazen that he stole a tanker owned by the Philippine government, M/T Tabangao. The embarrassment that this event caused the government motivated an increased effort to stop the gang's piracy. Changco was soon arrested and imprisoned in the New Bilibid Prison in Manila. In 1992, while a prisoner, Changco was shot and killed during what authorities stated was an attempt to escape from jail. The circumstances surrounding his death are suspicious as at the time of his death he could barely walk and needed a cane. In his book, The Brutal Seas: Organised Crime at Work, author Douglas Stewart discusses how Changco's death was more likely an effort to silence him than due to a legitimate escape attempt.

References

 - Total pages: 372 

Filipino gangsters
Crime bosses
Filipino pirates
1992 deaths
Year of birth missing
Deaths by firearm in the Philippines